Gunadala Mary Matha Church (also: St.Mary's Church or Mary Matha Shrine) is a shrine of Mary, mother of Jesus and a pilgrim destination for Christians in the city of Vijayawada.

References 

Roman Catholic churches in Andhra Pradesh
Buildings and structures in Vijayawada
Religious buildings and structures in Vijayawada